Laurence de Cambronne (born 1 May 1951, Casablanca, Morocco) is a French journalist, novelist and humanitarian.

Biography

Family and formation 
Descendant of Arnouph Deshayes de Cambronne and Paul Cottin on her father's side and of Ernest Picard-Destelan and Joseph Thebaud on her mother's side, she is a niece of rear admiral, François Picard-Destelan, former president of the International Monetary Fund, Jacques de Larosière, admiral of the United States Navy, Leo Hewlett Thebaud and American philanthropist, Louis A. Thebaud.

She was inspired by the diaries kept by her mother, Marie Picard Destelan, during the Second World War, her succinct notes on her day's activities, her meetings with a married man based on her father, Claude de Cambronne, an aircraft manufacturer, co-founder of Bordeaux-Aéronautique, the aryanized company of Marcel Dassault (ex-Bloch) ; Raphael Alibert, who promulgated the first Law on the status of Jews of October 1940 and René Hardy, suspected of being instrumental in the arrest of Jean Moulin and General Charles Delestraint, to write Les petits agendss rouges, in 2004. Her sister, Beatrice de Cambronne, a stylist was married to the Belgo-Russian writer and scenarist André Couteaux, the father of Paul-Marie Coûteaux, french politician, and member of Reconquête, since 2022.

Laurence de Cambronne was married to the French journalist and television producer Marc Gilbert from 1973 to 1982, and to the journalist Fabien Roland-Lévy, from 1987 to 2003. In 1987, represented by the monarchist lawyer Raymond de Geouffre de la Pradelle and her notary Bruno Cheuvreux, she wins in appeal and inherits from her first husband, who committed suicide in 1982, from a will described as wishful thinking ("voeu pieux") and set a judicial precedent.

She went to the Cours Hattemer and Sainte-Marie de Neuilly.

Career 
For Paris Match, from 1972 to 1983, she writes about nude beaches, alcoholism and interviews Georges Dumézil for Le Point in 1984, after joining ELLE magazine, in 1983.

She is editor in chief adjunct from 1993 to 2008, and interviews for the magazine : Lionel Jospin, Jean-Pierre Chevènement, Édith Cresson, Georgina Dufoix, Michel Rocard or Françoise Fabius. in charge of the pages Vie Privée, C’est mon histoire, Une journée avec, inspired by the last page of The Sunday Times Magazine, One day in the life of and the Elle à Paris section of the magazine.

She also participated in 1996 in the launch of the French television channel Téva.

In 2011, she withdraws from the "Literary Prize for Knowledge and research”, created by the novelist Laurence Biava to reward “literary texts on science”, the neo-nazi activist, Maxime Brunerie, known for having tried to kill the former President of the Republic Jacques Chirac on July 14, 2002, being part of the jury.

In 2015, during the European migrant crisis, she joins associations, in Leros, as a volunteer, to help creating shelters for Syrian women and children, during their Immigration to Greece. She is mentioned by Emmanuel Carrère, in his novel, Yoga (2020), diagnosed as having Bipolar disorder, accused of arranging the truth to "serve his image" and of "dwelling two months meeting refugees in Leros which would have lasted only a few days", "tricking and transforming a legal constraint into self-glorification", using dichotomy, mythomania, uchronia, and with the "obsession of bifurcation", towards a universe of lies:

Our friend Laurence de Cambronne, who was a journalist before living in Patmos for half of the year, has returned to work for a report in Leros. She comes to dinner at the house, she tells, she gets excited. She speaks of the courage of migrants, of the indifference of some, of the dedication of others, of an American historian who left everything to do there, she says, a wonderful job. Listening to her, we are a little ashamed of our carelessness of being happy in the world, dressed in elegantly creased white linen and mainly busy choosing the day's beach according to the tavern and canopy. (Emmanuel Carrère, Yoga, Éditions Gallimard, october 2020)

Bibliography

Writer 
 Le Danger de naître : Entretiens avec Laurence de Cambronne, with Claude Sureau, Plon, 1993 
 Votre premier mois avec bébé : Les 100 questions que se pose une mère dans les jours qui suivent la naissance de son enfant, Robert Laffont, 1998
 Les petits agendas rouges, Plon, 2004 
 Les plus belles histoires d'amour de Elle : C'est mon histoire, with Antoine Silber, Robert Laffont, 2006

Collection manager 
Gilles Verdiani, Mon métier de père, JC Lattès, 2012
Marta de Tena, La garde alternée, JC Lattès, 2012
Maryline Baumard, Vive la pension !, JC Lattès, 2012
François Reynaert and Vincent Brocvielle, Le Kit du 21e siècle, JC Lattès, 2013
Anne Dufourmantelle and Laure Leter, Se trouver, JC Lattès, 2014

Biographies 
 Madame de Staël, la femme qui faisait trembler Napoléon, Allary Éditions, 2015
 Je suis d'Alep, itinéraire d'un migrant ordinaire, avec Joude Jassouma, Allary Éditions, 2017

Awards 
Nomination for the Prix Simone Veil des Femmes de Lettres

See also 
 French literature
 French history
 French press
 Marc Gilbert 
 Famille Cottin

Notes

External links
Biography on Allary Editions website

1951 births
Living people
20th-century French journalists
21st-century French novelists
People from Casablanca
Women biographers
Elle (magazine) writers
Paris Match writers
French humanitarians
20th-century French novelists
21st-century French journalists
French women journalists
French biographers
Women magazine editors
French women novelists
20th-century French women writers
21st-century French women writers
French magazine editors